The 2001–02 Calgary Flames season was the 22nd National Hockey League season in Calgary.  It began with wholesale changes, as second year General Manager Craig Button continued to change the look of the team.  In two separate draft-day trades, the Flames dealt goaltender Fred Braithwaite and forwards Valeri Bure and Jason Wiemer away, gaining back Roman Turek and Rob Niedermayer.

The changes appeared to pay off, as the Flames stormed out to a 13–2–2–2 record, and first place in the division.  The result prompted the Flames to sign Turek - a pending unrestricted free agent - to a long-term deal.  The team, however, collapsed, winning only 19 of their remaining 63 games, finishing 4th in the Northwest Division, and out of the playoffs for the sixth consecutive season.

The season ended with head coach Greg Gilbert and top forward Marc Savard in a bitter, public feud that included the latter demanding a trade late in the season and into the summer.

Individually, Jarome Iginla broke into the spotlight, leading the NHL in goals (52) and points (96).  His season would land him the Rocket Richard Trophy, the Art Ross Trophy and the Lester B. Pearson Award.  Iginla also finished second in Hart Memorial Trophy voting, tied with winner Jose Theodore on points (434), but behind Theodore in first place votes (26–23).

Iginla was also a member of Canada's team at the 2002 Salt Lake Olympics.  He recorded two goals in the gold medal game against the United States, which Canada won 5–2 to claim their first ice hockey gold medal in 50 years.

Regular season
Bob Boughner and Craig Conroy were named co-captains of the team on February 4, replacing Dave Lowry.

The Flames were involved in a tragic incident during their March 16, 2002, game in Columbus against the Blue Jackets.  During the second period of the contest, a slapshot by Columbus' Espen Knutsen was deflected into the crowd off the stick of Flames defenceman Derek Morris.  The puck struck a fan, 13-year-old Brittanie Cecil, who was at her first NHL game.  Though she was able to leave the game under her own power, the blow tore a vertebral artery and resulted in a blood clot.  She died two days later; she was the first fan to die at a game in the NHL's 85-year history. Three months after the incident, the NHL instituted a policy requiring that protective netting be placed around the ends of each rink prior to the start of the 2002–03 season, a decision which both the Flames and Blue Jackets advocated.

The Flames finished 11th in the Western Conference, 15 points back of the 8th place Vancouver Canucks.

Final standings

Schedule and results

|- align="center" bgcolor="#bbffbb" 
| 1 || October 3 || Edmonton || 0 – 1 || Calgary || || Turek || 16,242 || 1–0–0–0 || 2 || 
|- align="center" bgcolor="#bbffbb" 
| 2 || October 6 || Chicago || 0 – 4 || Calgary || || Turek || 14,038 || 2–0–0–0 || 4 || 
|- align="center" bgcolor="#ffdddd" 
| 3 || October 8 || Phoenix || 2 – 1 || Calgary || OT || Turek || 13,078 || 2–0–0–1 || 5 || 
|- align="center" bgcolor="#bbffbb" 
| 4 || October 10 || Calgary || 4 – 2 || Detroit || || Turek || 20,053 || 3–0–0–1 || 7 || 
|- align="center" bgcolor="#ffbbbb" 
| 5 || October 11 || Calgary || 0 – 1 || Nashville || || Vernon || 12,333 || 3–1–0–1 || 7 || 
|- align="center" bgcolor="#bbffbb" 
| 6 || October 13 || Calgary || 4 – 3 || Dallas || OT || Turek || 18,352 || 4–1–0–1 || 9 || 
|- align="center" bgcolor="#bbffbb" 
| 7 || October 18 || Florida || 1 – 3 || Calgary || || Turek || 15,093 || 5–1–0–1 || 11 || 
|- align="center" bgcolor="#bbffbb" 
| 8 || October 20 || Toronto || 1 – 4 || Calgary || || Turek || 17,279 || 6–1–0–1 || 13 || 
|- align="center" bgcolor="#bbffbb" 
| 9 || October 22 || Calgary || 3 – 2 || St. Louis || || Turek || 19,231 || 7–1–0–1 || 15 || 
|- align="center" bgcolor="#ffbbbb" 
| 10 || October 23 || Calgary || 3 – 6 || Chicago || || Vernon || 10,276 || 7–2–0–1 || 15 || 
|- align="center" bgcolor="#ffdddd" 
| 11 || October 25 || Nashville || 5 – 4 || Calgary || OT || Turek || 12,750 || 7–2–0–2 || 16 || 
|- align="center" bgcolor="#bbffbb" 
| 12 || October 27 || Minnesota || 2 – 4 || Calgary || || Turek || 14,088 || 8–2–0–2 || 18 || 
|-

|- align="center" bgcolor="#bbffbb" 
| 13 || November 1 || Columbus || 1 – 2 || Calgary || || Turek || 12,501 || 9–2–0–2 || 20 || 
|- align="center" bgcolor="#bbffbb" 
| 14 || November 3 || Montreal || 2 – 6 || Calgary || || Turek || 16,015 || 10–2–0–2 || 22 || 
|- align="center" bgcolor="#ffffbb" 
| 15 || November 7 || Calgary || 3 – 3 || Anaheim || OT || Turek || 9,639 || 10–2–1–2 || 23 || 
|- align="center" bgcolor="#bbffbb" 
| 16 || November 8 || Calgary || 3 – 2 || Los Angeles || || Turek || 14,459 || 11–2–1–2 || 25 || 
|- align="center" bgcolor="#bbffbb" 
| 17 || November 10 || Colorado || 0 – 2 || Calgary || || Turek || 17,409 || 12–2–1–2 || 27 || 
|- align="center" bgcolor="#ffffbb" 
| 18 || November 15 || Chicago || 2 – 2 || Calgary || || Turek || 16,226 || 12–2–2–2 || 28 || 
|- align="center" bgcolor="#bbffbb" 
| 19 || November 17 || St. Louis || 0 – 2 || Calgary || || Turek || 16,241 || 13–2–2–2 || 30 || 
|- align="center" bgcolor="#ffffbb" 
| 20 || November 20 || Los Angeles || 5 – 5 || Calgary || OT || Turek || 14,550 || 13–2–3–2 || 31 || 
|- align="center" bgcolor="#ffffbb" 
| 21 || November 22 || Calgary || 4 – 4 || Ottawa || OT || Turek || 16,839 || 13–2–4–2 || 32 || 
|- align="center" bgcolor="#ffbbbb" 
| 22 || November 23 || Calgary || 2 – 5 || Buffalo || || Vernon || 16,703 || 13–3–4–2 || 32 || 
|- align="center" bgcolor="#ffbbbb" 
| 23 || November 25 || Calgary || 3 – 4 || Columbus || || Vernon || 18,136 || 13–4–4–2 || 32 || 
|- align="center" bgcolor="#ffbbbb" 
| 24 || November 27 || Calgary || 2 – 4 || Detroit || || Turek || 20,058 || 13–5–4–2 || 32 || 
|- align="center" bgcolor="#ffbbbb" 
| 25 || November 29 || Dallas || 3 – 0 || Calgary || || Turek || 15,610 || 13–6–4–2 || 32 || 
|-

|- align="center" bgcolor="#ffffbb" 
| 26 || December 1 || Colorado || 2 – 2 || Calgary || OT || Turek || 15,806 || 13–6–5–2 || 33 || 
|- align="center" bgcolor="#bbffbb" 
| 27 || December 3 || Calgary || 2 – 0 || Los Angeles || || Turek || 15,105 || 14–6–5–2 || 35 || 
|- align="center" bgcolor="#ffffbb" 
| 28 || December 4 || Calgary || 2 – 2 || San Jose || OT || Vernon || 17,386 || 14–6–6–2 || 36 || 
|- align="center" bgcolor="#ffbbbb" 
| 29 || December 6 || San Jose || 3 – 1 || Calgary || || Turek || 13,012 || 14–7–6–2 || 36 || 
|- align="center" bgcolor="#ffbbbb" 
| 30 || December 8 || Anaheim || 4 – 0 || Calgary || || Vernon || 14,330 || 14–8–6–2 || 36 || 
|- align="center" bgcolor="#bbffbb" 
| 31 || December 10 || Detroit || 0 – 2 || Calgary || || Vernon || 16,009 || 15–8–6–2 || 38 || 
|- align="center" bgcolor="#ffbbbb" 
| 32 || December 12 || Tampa Bay || 3 – 1 || Calgary || || Whitmore || 13,913 || 15–9–6–2 || 38 || 
|- align="center" bgcolor="#bbffbb" 
| 33 || December 14 || Calgary || 4 – 3 || Dallas || || Turek || 18,532 || 16–9–6–2 || 40 || 
|- align="center" bgcolor="#ffbbbb" 
| 34 || December 15 || Calgary || 0 – 4 || St. Louis || || Turek || 18,810 || 16–10–6–2 || 40 || 
|- align="center" bgcolor="#ffbbbb" 
| 35 || December 19 || Calgary || 3 – 6 || Phoenix || || Turek || 11,921 || 16–11–6–2 || 40 || 
|- align="center" bgcolor="#ffffbb"
| 36 || December 21 || Calgary || 2 – 2 || Colorado || OT || Turek || 18,007 || 16–11–7–2 || 41 || 
|- align="center" bgcolor="#ffbbbb" 
| 37 || December 26 || Calgary || 2 – 3 || Edmonton || || Turek || 16,839 || 16–12–7–2 || 41 || 
|- align="center" bgcolor="#ffbbbb" 
| 38 || December 27 || Calgary || 2 – 4 || Vancouver || || Turek || 18,422 || 16–13–7–2 || 41 || 
|- align="center" bgcolor="#bbffbb" 
| 39 || December 29 || Minnesota || 3 – 4 || Calgary || || Turek || 16,730 || 17–13–7–2 || 43 || 
|- align="center" bgcolor="#ffffbb"
| 40 || December 31 || Edmonton || 2 – 2 || Calgary || OT || Turek || 17,409 || 17–13–8–2 || 44 || 
|-

|- align="center" bgcolor="#bbffbb" 
| 41 || January 3 || Buffalo || 1 – 3 || Calgary || || Turek || 15,316 || 18–13–8–2 || 46 || 
|- align="center" bgcolor="#ffbbbb" 
| 42 || January 5 || Montreal || 4 – 2 || Calgary || || Turek || 17,409 || 18–14–8–2 || 46 || 
|- align="center" bgcolor="#bbffbb" 
| 43 || January 8 || Calgary || 5 – 2 || NY Islanders || || Turek || 13,285 || 19–14–8–2 || 48 || 
|- align="center" bgcolor="#ffbbbb" 
| 44 || January 9 || Calgary || 1 – 5 || New Jersey || || Turek || 16,200 || 19–15–8–2 || 48 || 
|- align="center" bgcolor="#ffbbbb" 
| 45 || January 11 || Calgary || 0 – 1 || Atlanta || || Turek || 17,856 || 19–16–8–2 || 48 || 
|- align="center" bgcolor="#ffbbbb" 
| 46 || January 15 || NY Islanders || 3 – 1 || Calgary || || Turek || 15,624 || 19–17–8–2 || 48 || 
|- align="center" bgcolor="#ffbbbb" 
| 47 || January 17 || Pittsburgh || 6 – 4 || Calgary || || Turek || 15,437 || 19–18–8–2 || 48 || 
|- align="center" bgcolor="#bbffbb" 
| 48 || January 19 || Anaheim || 1 – 2 || Calgary || || Turek || 17,409 || 20–18–8–2 || 50 || 
|- align="center" bgcolor="#ffbbbb" 
| 49 || January 22 || Toronto || 6 – 1 || Calgary || || Turek || 17,409 || 20–19–8–2 || 50 || 
|- align="center" bgcolor="#ffbbbb" 
| 50 || January 24 || Colorado || 2 – 0 || Calgary || || Turek || 15,639 || 20–20–8–2 || 50 || 
|- align="center" bgcolor="#ffbbbb" 
| 51 || January 26 || Vancouver || 2 – 0 || Calgary || || Turek || 17,068 || 20–21–8–2 || 50 || 
|- align="center" bgcolor="#bbffbb" 
| 52 || January 28 || Calgary || 3 – 2 || Minnesota || OT || Turek || 18,568 || 21–21–8–2 || 52 || 
|- align="center" bgcolor="#bbffbb" 
| 53 || January 30 || Detroit || 3 – 4 || Calgary || || Turek || 17,239 || 22–21–8–2 || 54 || 
|-

|- align="center" bgcolor="#ffbbbb" 
| 54 || February 6 || Calgary || 0 – 2 || San Jose || || Vernon || 17,383 || 22–22–8–2 || 54 || 
|- align="center" bgcolor="#ffbbbb" 
| 55 || February 8 || Vancouver || 4 – 1 || Calgary || || Turek || 16,695 || 22–23–8–2 || 54 || 
|- align="center" bgcolor="#bbffbb" 
| 56 || February 9 || Calgary || 4 – 3 || Vancouver || || Turek || 18,422 || 23–23–8–2 || 56 || 
|- align="center" bgcolor="#ffdddd" 
| 57 || February 12 || Calgary || 3 – 4 || Phoenix || OT || Turek || 11,480 || 23–23–8–3 || 57 || 
|- align="center" bgcolor="#ffbbbb" 
| 58 || February 13 || Calgary || 2 – 3 || Anaheim || || Turek || 9,583 || 23–24–8–3 || 57 || 
|- align="center" bgcolor="#ffffbb" 
| 59 || February 26 || Calgary || 2 – 2 || Colorado || OT || Turek || 18,007 || 23–24–9–3 || 58 || 
|- align="center" bgcolor="#bbffbb" 
| 60 || February 28 || St. Louis || 2 – 3 || Calgary || || Turek || 16,053 || 24–24–9–3 || 60 || 
|-

|- align="center" bgcolor="#bbffbb" 
| 61 || March 2 || Nashville || 2 – 5 || Calgary || || Turek || 17,163 || 25–24–9–3 || 62 || 
|- align="center" bgcolor="#bbffbb" 
| 62 || March 4 || Calgary || 5 – 3 || NY Rangers || || Turek || 18,200 || 26–24–9–3 || 64 || 
|- align="center" bgcolor="#ffbbbb" 
| 63 || March 6 || Calgary || 2 – 3 || Washington || || Turek || 15,817 || 26–25–9–3 || 64 || 
|- align="center" bgcolor="#bbffbb" 
| 64 || March 7 || Calgary || 4 – 2 || Philadelphia || || Turek || 19,532 || 27–25–9–3 || 66 || 
|- align="center" bgcolor="#ffbbbb" 
| 65 || March 9 || Calgary || 2 – 3 || Boston || || Turek || 17,565 || 27–26–9–3 || 66 || 
|- align="center" bgcolor="#ffffbb" 
| 66 || March 11 || Calgary || 3 – 3 || Carolina || OT || Turek || 12,665 || 27–26–10–3 || 67 || 
|- align="center" bgcolor="#ffffbb" 
| 67 || March 13 || Calgary || 3 – 3 || Florida || OT || Turek || 13,868 || 27–26–11–3 || 68 || 
|- align="center" bgcolor="#ffbbbb" 
| 68 || March 14 || Calgary || 2 – 3 || Tampa Bay || || Vernon || 13,473 || 27–27–11–3 || 68 || 
|- align="center" bgcolor="#ffbbbb" 
| 69 || March 16 || Calgary || 1 – 3 || Columbus || || Turek || 18,136 || 27–28–11–3 || 68 || 
|- align="center" bgcolor="#ffbbbb" 
| 70 || March 18 || Calgary || 2 – 4 || Minnesota || || Turek || 18,064 || 27–29–11–3 || 68 || 
|- align="center" bgcolor="#ffbbbb" 
| 71 || March 21 || San Jose || 4 – 1 || Calgary || || Turek || 16,495 || 27–30–11–3 || 68 || 
|- align="center" bgcolor="#ffbbbb" 
| 72 || March 23 || Calgary || 1 – 3 || Edmonton || || Turek || 16,839 || 27–31–11–3 || 68 || 
|- align="center" bgcolor="#bbffbb" 
| 73 || March 25 || Columbus || 1 – 6 || Calgary || || Vernon || 15,211 || 28–31–11–3 || 70 || 
|- align="center" bgcolor="#ffffbb" 
| 74 || March 28 || Dallas || 2 – 2 || Calgary || OT || Turek || 16,473 || 28–31–12–3 || 71 || 
|- align="center" bgcolor="#bbffbb" 
| 75 || March 30 || Los Angeles || 3 – 5 || Calgary || || Turek || 17,046 || 29–31–12–3 || 73 || 
|-

|- align="center" bgcolor="#bbffbb" 
| 76 || April 2 || Atlanta || 2 – 4 || Calgary || || Turek || 14,562 || 30–31–12–3 || 75 || 
|- align="center" bgcolor="#bbffbb" 
| 77 || April 4 || Minnesota || 3 – 4 || Calgary || || Turek || 13,831 || 31–31–12–3 || 77 || 
|- align="center" bgcolor="#ffbbbb" 
| 78 || April 6 || Calgary || 1 – 3 || Nashville || || Turek || 15,361 || 31–32–12–3 || 77 || 
|- align="center" bgcolor="#ffbbbb" 
| 79 || April 7 || Calgary || 2 – 3 || Chicago || || Vernon || 17,009 || 31–33–12–3 || 77 || 
|- align="center" bgcolor="#ffbbbb" 
| 80 || April 9 || Phoenix || 4 – 2 || Calgary || || Turek || 15,229 || 31–34–12–3 || 77 || 
|- align="center" bgcolor="#bbffbb" 
| 81 || April 12 || Calgary || 2 – 0 || Edmonton || || Turek || 16,839 || 32–24–12–3 || 79 || 
|- align="center" bgcolor="#ffbbbb" 
| 82 || April 13 || Vancouver || 4 – 1 || Calgary || || Vernon || 18,829 || 32–35–12–3 || 79 || 
|-

|-
| Legend:

Player statistics

Scoring
 Position abbreviations: C = Centre; D = Defence; G = Goaltender; LW = Left Wing; RW = Right Wing
  = Joined team via a transaction (e.g., trade, waivers, signing) during the season. Stats reflect time with the Flames only.
  = Left team via a transaction (e.g., trade, waivers, release) during the season. Stats reflect time with the Flames only.
 Bold text denotes league leader.

Goaltending

Transactions
The Flames were involved in the following transactions from June 10, 2001, the day after the deciding game of the 2001 Stanley Cup Finals, through June 13, 2002, the day of the deciding game of the 2002 Stanley Cup Finals.

Trades

Players acquired

Players lost

Signings

Draft picks

Calgary's picks at the 2001 NHL Entry Draft in Sunrise, Florida. The Flames had the 11th overall pick, however traded it to the Phoenix Coyotes in a swap that saw them gain the 14th pick.

Farm teams

Saint John Flames
The baby Flames followed up their Calder Cup winning season with a disappointing 29–34–13–4 result in 2001–02, finishing in last place in the Canadian Division, missing the playoffs.  Blair Betts led the Flames with just 49 points, while Dany Sabourin was the top goaltender in limited action.

Johnstown Chiefs
The Chiefs finished the 2001–02 ECHL season with a 39–31–2 record, good enough for third place in the Northwest Division.  They were knocked out of the playoffs in the second round by the Dayton Bombers.

See also
 2001–02 NHL season

Notes

References

Player stats: 2006–07 Calgary Flames Media Guide - 2001–02 stats, p. 110.

Calgary Flames seasons
Calgary Flames season, 2001-02
Cal